The 157th Field Artillery Regiment (First Colorado) is a United States Army Regimental System field artillery parent regiment of the United States Army National Guard, represented in the Colorado Army National Guard by the 3rd Battalion, 157th Field Artillery Regiment, part of the 169th Field Artillery Brigade at Colorado Springs.

The regiment was first constituted in 1917 during World War I from the 1st Colorado Infantry Regiment. The regiment was an infantry regiment as part of the 40th Infantry Division.

It was again an infantry regiment of the 45th Infantry Division during and after World War II. In 1950 it was relieved from assignment from the 45th Division and after the Korean War assigned to the artillery. During the 1960s, 1970s and 1980s, the 1st and 2nd Battalions of the regiment operated the M110 howitzer. The retirement of the M110 system left many National Guard units without a mission. In 2002, the battalions transitioned to the M270 Multiple Launch Rocket System, and later in 2009 to the M142 High Mobility Artillery Rocket System (HIMARS) system.

1st and 2nd Battalions (MLRS), 157th Field Artillery Regiment were disbanded in 2006 during the U.S. Army's restructuring from divisional organizations to the modular Brigade Combat Team model. Members from the two battalions were reorganized to form the 3rd Battalion (HIMARS), 157th Field Artillery (3-157 FA), part of the 169th Field Artillery Brigade of the Colorado Army National Guard.

Meanwhile, the 1st Battalion, 157th Infantry Regiment was reconstituted, also in the Colorado Army National Guard. The 157th Infantry was constituted on 1 October 2007, and activated on 1 September 2008; it is technically a completely new regiment with no lineal connection to the previous 157th Infantry/157th Field Artillery; it inherits campaign participation credit and a decoration from other Colorado field artillery units. As of 30 October 2016 1st Battalion, 157th Infantry Regiment was reassigned to the 86th Infantry Brigade Combat Team (Mountain), Vermont National Guard, itself aligned with the 10th Mountain Division. It was also redesignated as a Mountain Battalion, becoming one of only three Mountain Infantry battalions in the Army National Guard.

Lineage of 157th Field Artillery Regiment

19th century
The regiment was originally constituted on 8 February 1879 in the Colorado National Guard as the 1st Infantry Battalion. It was organized on 29 December 1881, with headquarters in Denver. It was expanded and redesignated on 22 March 1883 as the 1st Regiment, Infantry, and was reduced and redesignated on 2 April 1889 as the 1st Infantry Battalion. On 15 April 1893, it was expanded and redesignated as the 1st Infantry Regiment, Colorado National Guard. The regiment was consolidated with the 2nd Infantry Regiment (organized 27 May 1887) and mustered into Federal service 1–8 May 1898 at Denver as the 1st Colorado Volunteer Infantry, and was mustered out of Federal service on 8 September 1899 at San Francisco, CA reverting to state status as the 1st Infantry Regiment.

20th century

The 1st Colorado was expanded in 1900 as the 1st and 2nd Infantry. The 1st and 2nd Infantry were consolidated on 5 June 1916 and designated as the 1st Infantry. Two battalions were mustered into federal service from 26 June to 29 July 1916 for service on the Mexican border as the 1st and 2nd Separate Battalions, Colorado Infantry. The entire regiment was drafted into Federal service for World War I on 5 August 1917, being reorganized and redesignated on 24 September 1917 as the 157th Infantry Regiment, an element of the 40th Division. On 13 October 1917, the 1st Colorado Cavalry (organized in 1880) was consolidated with the 157th Infantry. Demobilized 29 April 1919 at Fort D.A. Russell (Wyoming)

The former Infantry elements were reorganized and redesignated on 28 February 1921 in the Colorado National Guard as the 177th Infantry Regiment, with headquarters federally recognized on 26 October 1921 at Denver. On 16 November 1921, the 177th Infantry Regiment was redesignated as the 157th Infantry Regiment, an element of the 45th Division, subsequently the 45th Infantry Division. Inducted into federal service 16 September 1940 at home stations. Inactivated 3 December 1945 at Camp Bowie Texas. Relieved 10 May 1946 from assignment to the 45th infantry Division. Reorganized and federally recognized 8 January 1947 with headquarters at Buckley Field (Buckley Air Force Base) Location of headquarters changed 3 September 1947 to Denver. The regiment was broken up on 1 August 1955, and elements were converted and redesignated as follows;

 Headquarters and the 1st Battalion as the 144th Field Artillery Battalion.
 Headquarters company as Headquarters and Headquarters Battery, 169th Field Artillery Group;
 headquarters and headquarters company, 2nd Battalion and Companies E, K, and L as headquarters and Headquarters Battery, Service Battery, and Batteries A, and B, 142nd Field Artillery Battalion;
 Companies F, and H as Batteries A, and B 137th Field Artillery Battalion;
 Company G as Battery B 168th Field Artillery Battalion;
 Headquarters and Headquarters Company 3rd Battalion, Company M, Medical Company, and Tank Company as Service Battery, Headquarters and Headquarters Battery, and Batteries C, and B, 183rd Field Artillery Battalion;
 Company I, and Service Company as Service Battery B 169th Field Artillery Battalion;
 Heavy Mortar Company as Battery A, 188th Antiaircraft Artillery Battalion

The 144th Field Artillery Battalion was consolidated on 1 February 1959 with the 168th Field Artillery Battalion, the 183rd Field Artillery Battalion, and the 188th Antiaircraft Artillery Battalion, and the consolidated unit was reorganized and redesignated as the 157th Artillery, a parent Regiment under the U.S. Army Combat Arms Regimental System, to consist of the 1st, 2nd, 3rd, and 4th Howitzer Battalions. Reorganized 1 January 1968 to consist of the 1st and 2nd Battalions. Redesignated 1 March 1972 as the 157th Field Artillery. Withdrawn 1 June 1989 from the Combat Arms Regimental System and reorganized under the United States Army Regimental System.

Distinctive unit insignia
The distinctive unit insignia (DUI) was originally approved for the 157th Infantry Regiment on 12 June 1924. It was subsequently redesignated for the 144th Field Artillery Battalion of the Colorado National Guard on 1 May 1956. The insignia was redesignated for the 157th Artillery Regiment of the Colorado National Guard on 23 March 1961 and then redesignated for the 157th Field Artillery Regiment, Colorado Army National Guard on 28 August 1972.

The DUI is a gold color metal and enamel device 1 1/8 inches (2.86 cm) in height overall consisting of a shield blazoned: Per fess embattled Gules and Or in chief two wigwams of the second garnished of the first and in base a sea horse brandishing a sword in dexter paw of the last. Attached below and to the sides of the shield a Blue scroll inscribed "EAGER FOR DUTY" in Gold letters.

The shield is scarlet and yellow which are the Spanish colors; the parting line embattled in recollection of fortifications. The sea horse of the Philippines recalls that the fortification was the walled city of Manila. The two wigwams recall the Indian service in the frontier days.

Campaign participation credit
 War with Spain;
Manila
Philippine Insurrection;
Manila
Luzon 1899
World War I;
Champagne 1918
Champagne-Marne
Saint-Mihiel
Meuse-Argonne
World War II;
Sicily (with Arrowhead)
Naples-Foggia (with Arrowhead)
Anzio
Rome-Arno
Southern France (with Arrowhead)
Rhineland
Ardennes-Alsace
Central Europe

All of the above WW II Campaign credits were earned as the 157th Infantry Regiment of the 45th Infantry Division.

Decorations
 French Croix de Guerre with Palm, World War II, Streamer embroidered ITALY
 Headquarters Battery 2nd Bn. additionally entitled to;
 WWII-AP
Headquarters Battery, 1st Bn. and Service Battery 1st Bn. entitled to Presidential Unit Citation (Army) Streamer embroidered ANZIO

Medal of Honor recipients
 Edward G. Wilkin
 James D. Slaton
 Van T. Barfoot
 Almond E. Fisher

See also
 Felix L. Sparks

References
Notes

Bibliography

 https://web.archive.org/web/20120805184939/http://www.tioh.hqda.pentagon.mil/Heraldry/ArmyDUISSICOA/ArmyHeraldryUnit.aspx?u=3516

Flint Whitlock The Rock of Anzio: From Sicily to Dachau: A History of the U.S. 45th Infantry Division Westview Press, 1998 
 https://web.archive.org/web/20111227092629/http://files.usgwarchives.org/co/statewide/military/ww2/cong_p1_1940_intro_45id.txt

External links
 http://www.history.army.mil/html/forcestruc/lineages/branches/ada/default.htm
 http://www.45thdivision.org/CampaignsBattles/157thCombat_Printable.htm
 http://www.unithistories.com/units_index/default.asp?file=../units/45th%20Inf.Div.htm
 http://www.45thdivision.org/Photo_Gallery/gallery_157th.htm
 https://web.archive.org/web/20110725231902/http://creatingcommunities.denverlibrary.org/content/park-hill-camp-alva-adams
 https://web.archive.org/web/20110627172129/http://www.comilitaryhistorycenter.org/

157
Military units and formations in Colorado
Military units and formations established in 1917